Georgios Savva (22 October 1933 – 9 August 1992) was a Cypriot football striker and was the first foreign footballer ever to play professionally in Israel. He was also the first ever Greek Cypriot that played in a football championship outside Cyprus. Georgios comes from a working class Greek background mixed with Jewish heritage from one of his grandfathers.

He played football during the 1950s and he was one of the best ever Cypriot footballers. Sometimes he could play even as a defender. He began playing football for APOEL youth team in 1949 and one year later he became a member of the senior squad. Scoring two goals for his team in the Cypriot Cup final in 1951 against EPA Larnaca, APOEL won the final 7-0 (a record in a Cypriot Cup final until today) and he won the first trophy in his career. In 1952, he helped his team to win the Cypriot Championship and then, as the first professional Cypriot player he played football in England with Bristol City for one year and he also played for the representative team of London.

Arrival to Israel 
For the season 1955-56 he played for a year for Maccabi Haifa. Before Georgios, the only foreign players that played in Israel were British soldiers that were stationed in Israel during the British Mandate. The Cypriot striker was the first player ever to be brought in from abroad to play professional football in Israel.

Three offers from Israeli clubs were on the table though Georgios ended up only playing for Maccabi Haifa. Acclimation was difficult but eventually he settled in the port city and scored some goals to go down in the annals of history in Israeli football.

Back to Cyprus 
In 1956, he was brought back to Cyprus and he was the most important player of APOEL. In 1959, he beat by himself the Greece national football team, playing with a representative team of both AC Omonia and APOEL. He died on 9 August 1992.

References 
  Article about Savva by Simerini

External links 
  Profile and biography of Savva Georgiou on Maccabi Haifa's official website

1933 births
1992 deaths
Greek Cypriot people
Cypriot footballers
Cyprus international footballers
Association football forwards
Sportspeople from Nicosia
APOEL FC players
Bristol City F.C. players
Maccabi Haifa F.C. players
Liga Leumit players
Expatriate footballers in Israel
Cypriot expatriate sportspeople in Israel